In the United States, federal grants are economic aid issued by the United States government out of the general federal revenue.  A federal grant is an award of financial assistance from a federal agency to a recipient to carry out a public purpose of support or stimulation authorized by a law of the United States.

Grants are federal assistance to individuals, benefits or entitlements. A grant is  not used to acquire property or services for the federal government's direct benefit.

Grants may also be issued by private non-profit organizations such as foundations, not-for-profit corporations or charitable trusts  which are all collectively referred to as charities.

Outside the United States grants, subventions or subsidies are used to in similar fashion by government or private charities to subsidize programs and projects that fit within the funding criteria of the grant-giving entity or donor.  Grants can be unrestricted, to be used by the recipient in any fashion within the perimeter of the recipient organization's activities or they may be restricted to a specific purpose by the benefactor.

American definition
Federal grants are defined and governed by the Federal Grant and Cooperative Agreement Act of 1977, as incorporated in Title 31 Section 6304 of the U.S. Code.  A Federal grant is a:
"...legal instrument reflecting the relationship between the United States Government and a State, a local government, or other entity when 1) the principal purpose of the relationship is to transfer a thing of value to the State or local government or other recipient to carry out a public purpose of support or stimulation authorized by a law of the United States instead of acquiring (by purchase, lease, or barter) property or services for the direct benefit or use of the United States Government; and 2) substantial involvement is not expected between the executive agency and the State, local government, or other recipient when carrying out the activity contemplated in the agreement."

When an awarding agency expects to be substantially involved in a project (beyond routine monitoring and technical assistance), the law requires use of a cooperative agreement instead.  When the government is procuring goods or services for its own direct benefit, and not for a broader public purpose, the law requires use of a federal contract.

Types of grants

Categorical grants may be spent only for narrowly defined purposes and recipients often must match a portion of the federal funds. 33% of categorical grants are considered to be formula grants. About 90% of federal aid dollars are spent for categorical grants.
Project grants are grants given by the government to fund research projects, such as a research project for medical purposes. An individual must acquire certain qualifications before applying for such a grant and the normal duration for project grants is three years.
Formula grants provide funds as dictated by a law.
Block grants are large grants provided from the federal government to state or local governments for use in a general purpose.
Earmark grants are explicitly specified in appropriations of the U.S. Congress. They are not competitively awarded and have become highly controversial because of the heavy involvement of paid political lobbyists used in securing them. In FY1996 appropriations, the Congressional Research Service found 3,023 earmarks totaling $19.5 billion, while in FY2006 it found 12,852 earmarks totaling $64 billion.

For charitable grants and funds for schools and organizations see: Grant writing and Grants.

There are over 900 grant programs offered by the 26 federal grant-making agencies. These programs fall into 20 categories:

 Agriculture
 Arts
 Business and Commerce
 Community Development
 Consumer Protection
 Disaster Prevention and Relief
 Education Regional Development
 Employment, Labor, and Training
 Energy
 Environmental Quality
 Food and Nutrition
 Health
 Housing
 Humanities
 Information and Statistics
 Law, Justice, and Legal Services
 Natural Resources
 Science and Technology
 Social Services and Income Security
 Transportation

Information provided in grant applications
Award information in grants generally includes:
 Estimated funding
 Expected number of awards
 Anticipated award size
 Period of performance

Eligibility information includes:
  Eligible applicants
  Cost sharing

Criticism
Federal and state grants frequently receive criticism due to what are perceived to be excessive regulations and not include opportunities for small business, as well as for often giving more money per person to smaller states regardless of population or need. These criticisms include problems of overlap, duplication, excessive categorization, insufficient information, varying requirements, arbitrary federal decision-making, and grantsmanship (a funding bias toward entities most familiar with how to exploit the system, rather than to those most in need). Research also suggests that federal grants are often allocated politically, with more money going to areas represented by the political party commanding a majority in Congress or that controls the presidency.

Examples of grants by type

Block 
Community Development Block Grant
Alcohol, Drug Abuse, and Mental Health Services Block Grant (ADMS)
Substance Abuse Prevention and Treatment Block Grant (SABG or SAPT)
Community Mental Health Services Block Grant (MHBG or CMHS)
Local Law Enforcement Block Grant
National Institutes of Health for bioscience research
National Science Foundation for physical science research

Formulary 
Aid to Families with Dependent Children
Job Training Partnership Act

Categorical 
Head Start Program
Magnet Schools Assistance Program

See also
 Grant writing
 Federally Funded Research and Development Center (FFRDC)
 Funding Opportunity Announcement
 Small Business Administration
 National Grants Management Association (NGMA)

References

External links
Grants.gov: Official U.S. government site for finding grants for non-profits
Business.gov Loans and Grants Search: Find small business grants and loans from government agencies
Presidential Initiative: Grants Management Line of Business
ED.gov Federal Pell Grant Program: Official site for the federal pell grant

Public finance
Federal assistance in the United States
Grants (money)
Subsidies